Philip James Villapiano (born February 26, 1949) is a former American football linebacker who played 13 seasons in the National Football League (NFL).

Early life
He played college football at Bowling Green State University, and while there was selected as Mid-America Conference Player of the Year.

Career
1971 AFC Defensive Rookie of the Year
1975 & 1976 All-NFL Pro Bowl
1972-1976 All-AFC Pro Bowl
1976 Member of the Oakland Raiders Super Bowl XI winning team

Known for his coverage and long time friendship to Steelers Hall of Fame inductee Franco Harris in one of the top plays in the history of the NFL, in 1972, a play known as the “Immaculate Reception.”

One of the fastest linebackers of his era, Phil specialized in making big plays - none bigger than his momentum changing goal-line tackle against the Minnesota Vikings in Super Bowl XI, where he forced the fumble that was recovered by Willie Hall. Villapiano was the linebacker assigned to cover Franco Harris during the Immaculate Reception on December 23, 1972.

In March 2018, Villapiano was inducted into the Reese's Senior Bowl Hall of Fame. The next month Phil was voted as the Jersey Shore's Greatest Sports Personality Winner.  Phil Villapiano was also selected as a 2019 Senior Class candidate for the Pro Football Hall of Fame.

Personal life
Phil has three children; Andrea, Phil, and Michael.  Michael was a quarterback at Brown University. Phil's wife, Susan, died of breast cancer on November 22, 2016.

His nephew Joe Villapiano is a college football coach and has been the offensive coordinator at Cornell University since 2017.

Activities after playing career

In January 2018, Phil was recognized as a candidate for the Pro Football Hall of Fame in Canton, OH. Later, in March 2018, Phil was named to the Hall of Fame for the College Senior Bowl in Mobile, AL.  Later in the summer of 2018, Phil was named as the greatest sports personality for the Jersey Shore in a month long contest that included some of the most prolific names in New Jersey's outstanding sports history. As a 2019 Senior Class candidate for the Pro Football Hall of Fame, Villapiano has achieved acknowledgement as a solid finalist and is considered a strong candidate for future induction. 

In March 2018, Villapiano joined with former NFL stars Harry Carson and Nick Buoniconti to support a parent initiative called Flag Football Under 14, which recommends no tackle football below that age out of a concern for the brain health of the young players.  He said, "At some point, those of us who have had success in this game must speak up to protect both football players and the future of the game, and supporting 'Flag Football Under 14' is our best way to do that."

Phil was inducted into the Italian Hall of Fame and is a candidate for induction into the NJ State Hall of Fame.

The Villapiano Fan Club consists of members all across the country run by his family and close friends, are always hosting events during Raiders season.

Phil has also been actively involved in many philanthropic causes such as Save the Jersey Shore post Hurricane Sandy, an executive in the Jimmy V foundation, and numerous programs in his local community of Rumson, NJ and at his alma mater, Bowling Green State University. In recognition of the 100th anniversary of Bowling Green State University Football, Villapiano and nine other former BGSU football players were inducted into the university's Cast of Honor, recognizing the "Best of the Best" by hanging their names and numbers in Doyt L. Perry Stadium.

References

External links
 
 
 

1949 births
Living people
American people of Italian descent
American football linebackers
Bowling Green Falcons football players
Buffalo Bills players
Oakland Raiders players
American Conference Pro Bowl players
Asbury Park High School alumni
Ocean Township High School alumni
Sportspeople from Long Branch, New Jersey
People from Ocean Township, Monmouth County, New Jersey
Sportspeople from Monmouth County, New Jersey